Asghar Ebrahimi Farbod Kamachali (born 1 April 1982 in Rasht) is an Iranian weightlifter.

Major results

References

External links
 
 
 
 

1982 births
Living people
Iranian male weightlifters
Iranian strength athletes
Olympic weightlifters of Iran
People from Rasht
Weightlifters at the 2004 Summer Olympics
Weightlifters at the 2008 Summer Olympics
Asian Games silver medalists for Iran
Asian Games medalists in weightlifting
Weightlifters at the 2010 Asian Games
Medalists at the 2010 Asian Games
Sportspeople from Gilan province
21st-century Iranian people